The cytotype is a characteristic of a cell. Organisms of the same species with different cytotypes differ in:

 Karyotype
 with different chromosome structure
 with different chromosome number, ploidy
 Mitochondrial genome, the mitochondrial cytotype
 Chloroplast genome, the chloroplast cytotype